Cebaracetam is a chemical in the racetam family. It is a chlorinated acetylpiperazine-substituted analog of phenylpiracetam.

See also 
 Racetam
 Phenylpiracetam
 Piracetam

References 

Racetams
Chloroarenes
Acetamides
Piperazines